New York Dead is the first novel in the Stone Barrington series by Stuart Woods.

It was first published in 1991 by HarperCollins. The novel takes place in New York City. The novel begins the story of Stone Barrington, a retired detective turned lawyer/private investigator.

External links
Stuart Woods website

1991 American novels
Novels set in New York City
HarperCollins books